Lindman is a surname. Notable people with the surname include:

Åke Lindman (1928–2009), Finnish film director and actor
Anna Lindman (born 1972), Swedish journalist and television presenter
Arvid Lindman (1862–1936), Swedish politician and Prime Minister of Sweden
Bo Lindman (1899–1992), Swedish modern pentathlete
Carl Axel Magnus Lindman (1856–1928), Swedish botanist and botanical artist
Håkan Lindman (born 1961), Swedish footballer
Hans Lindman (1884–1957), Swedish footballer
Martin Lindman (born 1974), Swedish ice hockey player
Sven Lindman (born 1942), Swedish footballer
Victor Lindman (born 1995), Swedish ice hockey player